Claremont College is a government comprehensive senior secondary school located in  in the northern suburbs of , Tasmania, Australia. Established in 1990, the college caters for approximately 500 students in Years 11, 12 and optional Year 13 and is administered by the Tasmanian Department of Education. 

The college provides a full range of courses, preparing students for university, TAFE, traineeships and employment with courses delivered both on- and off-campus. The college facilities include a drama auditorium, sport and recreation centre, library, various computer laboratories, canteen, and many sporting fields.

Notable alumni
Luke Butterworth, cricket player
Dana Faletic, economist / Olympic rower
Brett Geeves, cricket player
Joanna Siejka, politician

See also 
 List of schools in Tasmania
 Education in Tasmania

References

External links
 Claremont College website

Educational institutions established in 1990
Colleges in Tasmania
1990 establishments in Australia
City of Glenorchy